Kue kochi or koci (also known as passover cake in English) is a Maritime Southeast Asian dumpling (kue or kuih) found in Javanese, Malay and Peranakan cuisine, made from glutinous rice flour, and stuffed with coconut fillings with palm sugar.

In Brunei, Indonesia, Malaysia and Singapore, this snack is often as a dessert and can be eaten anytime (during breakfast or tea time). The black colour of the unpolished rice symbolises death, while the sweet filling represents resurrection.

See also 

 Peranakan cuisine
 Mochi - similar dessert in Japan which make from glutinous rice flour.

References 

Bruneian cuisine
Indonesian cuisine
Malaysian cuisine
Singaporean cuisine
Malay cuisine
Dumplings